Janique LeBlanc is a Canadian curler from Fall River, Nova Scotia.

Curling career
At just 16 years old, LeBlanc played lead for the Mary Fay rink along with, Jenn Smith and Karlee Burgess and won the 2014 Nova Scotia Junior women's championship. They were the youngest team to win in 20 years., sending the four-some to the 2014 Canadian Junior Curling Championships to represent Nova Scotia.  Despite their youth, the team finished with an 8-2 record, making the playoffs. The team would go on to lose to British Columbia, skipped by Kalia Van Osch in the semi-final, winning a bronze medal. The next year, the Fay rink won their second U21 Nova Scotia Provincials, earning the right to represent Nova Scotia at their second back-to-back Canadian Junior Curling Championship. The rink fell one step shorter than their previous year, finishing in a tie for fourth place with a 6-4 record. The Fay rink then qualified for the 2016 Canadian Juniors with their third provincial title. The rink finished in first place after the round robin with a 9-1 record, earning the rink a direct bye to the finals. In the finals, she played the British Columbia rink, this time skipped by Sarah Daniels, and won her first Canadian Junior title by defeating the British Columbia rink 9-5, and therefore representing Canada at the 2016 World Juniors in Copenhagen, Denmark.

Team Fay has also won three Under-15 provincial championships and won the 2013 Under-18 provincial championships, as well as the 2013 U-18 Atlantics. They represented Nova Scotia at the 2015 Canada Winter Games after beating club mate Cassie Cocks 7-3 in the provincial final. During the week of December 1, 2014, LeBlanc was named the team Nova Scotia athlete of the week  While at the games LeBlanc and her Nova Scotian team went undefeated through the Round Robin, finishing with a perfect 5-0 record. According to the announcers when their game against Manitoba was televised on TSN, the Fay rink had the highest player percentages at every position and the highest team percentage after the first two draws. Their perfect record in the Round Robin earned them a bye to the Semi Finals. They once again played New Brunswick's Justine Comeau, after defeating her 7-5 in the Round Robin, and won on the last rock in the last end in a 7-6 decision. They went on to play Ontario in the Gold Medal Game, in which 6-5 in an extra end. Jenn Smith and the Fay rink then parted ways after the completion of the 2014-15 season.

The Fay rink would play in their first World Curling Tour event at the 2014 Gibson's Cashspiel, where they lost in the final to Mary-Anne Arsenault.

Personal life

LeBlanc is the daughter of Jacques and Jocelyn LeBlanc. She is of Acadian descent and is fluent in both English and French.

LeBlanc attended École secondaire du Sommet in Halifax, Nova Scotia and is now attending Université de Moncton doing the Bachelor of Science in Nursing program.

Teams

References

External links
 

1997 births
Living people
Canadian women curlers
Curlers from Nova Scotia
Sportspeople from Halifax, Nova Scotia